STANLIB is a South African asset manager based in Melrose Arch, Johannesburg which is a wholly owned subsidiary of JSE-listed Liberty Holdings Limited. STANLIB operates in nine African countries, and in key developed markets globally. The company was formed in 2002 when Liberty Asset Management (LIBAM) and Standard Corporate and Merchant Bank Asset Management merged. Both of these companies at the time were subsidiaries of Liberty Holdings and Standard Bank respectively. It is the biggest unit trust company by market share, managing capital for over 400,000 clients. It runs the oldest existing unit trust in South Africa which was developed by Liberty. STANLIB manages and administers R608 billion (USD49 billion) (as at 31 December 2017) assets for more than 500,000 retail and institutional clients.

History 
STANLIB's predecessor was incorporated in 1862 when the Standard Bank of British South Africa was founded in London. It became a South African bank in 1962. Life assurer Liberty Life was founded in 1957. The first unit trust was launched by Guardbank Management Corporation Ltd in 1970. 
STANLIB's formation was the result of the amalgamation of seven Standard Bank and Liberty businesses in May 2002. The amalgamation of various unit trust ranges followed in 2004.  In June 2006, 15 investment franchises were formed. In the same year, STANLIB's wealth business was integrated with asset management functions. Later in 2006, a distribution and client support function was established in the UK, in order to offer products suitable for international investors.
Operations were expanded to Uganda and Botswana in 1992, Namibia in 1994, and Swaziland and Kenya in 1999. Lesotho followed in 2001.
STANLIB Africa has operated since 1997. Since its inception, STANLIB Africa has secured retail and institutional mandates in 7 countries outside South Africa.
In 2007, the part of STANLIB not already owned by Liberty Holdings Limited was acquired by the latter. Liberty Holdings Limited has retained ownership since then.

References

Financial services companies of South Africa
Investment management companies of South Africa
Companies based in Johannesburg